Ataxia operaria is a species of beetle in the family Cerambycidae. It was described by Wilhelm Ferdinand Erichson in 1848, originally under the genus Hebestola. It has a wide distribution in South and Central America.

References

Ataxia (beetle)
Beetles described in 1848